The Longford Lyell Award is a lifetime achievement award presented by the Australian Academy of Cinema and Television Arts (AACTA), a non-profit organisation whose aim is "to identify, award, promote and celebrate Australia's greatest achievements in film and television." The award is presented at the annual AACTA Awards, which hand out accolades for technical achievements in feature film, television, documentaries and short films. From 1968 to 2010, the award was presented by the Australian Film Institute (AFI), the Academy's parent organisation, at the annual Australian Film Institute Awards (known as the AFI Awards). When the AFI launched the Academy in 2011, it changed the annual ceremony to the AACTA Awards, with the current award being a continuum of the AFI Raymond Longford Award.

Originally named after Australian prolific producer, director, writer and actor Raymond Longford (1878–1959), the award recognises "a person who has shown an unwavering commitment over many years to excellence in the film and television industries and has, through their body of work to date, contributed substantially to the enrichment of Australian screen culture", and is the highest honour the Academy bestows. In 2015, the name of the award was changed to Longford Lyell Award in recognition of Longford's creative and life partner, actress and filmmaker Lottie Lyell.

Recipients of this award are film and television directors, directors, producers, actors, cinematographers and film editors. People of Australian origin dominate the list, but European-born Australian citizens have also been recognised. The award was first presented to film director and editor Ian Dunlop (director). The award has also been made posthumously to actor John Meillon in 1989 who died that year.

Winners

References

External links

AACTA Awards
Lifetime achievement awards